Jessica Susanne Zindalai Polfjärd (born 27 May 1971) is a Swedish politician of the Moderate Party. She was elected Member of the European Parliament in the 2019 European Parliament election in Sweden.

Early life and education
Polfjärd was born in South Korea and came to Sweden by the age of 9 months, through adoption, in 1972.

Political career

Career in national politics
Polfjärd has been a member of the Riksdag since the 2006 elections and served as chairman of the Employment Committee of the Riksdag from 2013 to 2014. She was also a member of the Committee on Industry and Trade from 2010 until 2013. She eventually served as the group leader of the Moderate Party in the Riksdag from January 2015 to October 2017.

In addition to her committee assignments, Polfjärd was a member of the Swedish delegation to the Nordic Council from 2006 until 2012 and from 2018 until 2019.

Member of the European Parliament, 2019–present
Since becoming a Member of the European Parliament in 2019, Polfjärd has been serving on the Committee on the Environment, Public Health and Food Safety. In this capacity, she ha been the lead lawmaker on national climate targets for EU countries and greenhouse gas emission cuts, and is currently working on a law for the circular economy and second-hand market, as well as on a law to make batteries more sustainable.

Other activities
 Nordisk Kulturfond, Substitute Member of the Board (2019)

References

External links

Jessica Polfjärd at the Riksdag website

1971 births
Living people
Members of the Riksdag from the Moderate Party
Women members of the Riksdag
21st-century Swedish women politicians
Swedish adoptees
People from Seoul
Moderate Party MEPs
MEPs for Sweden 2019–2024
21st-century women MEPs for Sweden
South Korean emigrants to Sweden
Swedish people of South Korean descent